David Bowe may refer to:

 David Bowe (actor) (born 1964), American  character actor
 David Bowe (politician) (born 1955), British Member of the European Parliament

See also 
 David Bowie (disambiguation)
 David Bowes (born 1957), American painter